The Daily Mail is a British tabloid, published by the Daily Mail and General Trust.

Daily Mail may also refer to:

Newspapers
Accra Daily Mail, Ghanaian newspaper published in Accra
Bangkok Daily Mail, defunct newspaper published in Thailand
Charleston Daily Mail, defunct American newspaper once published in West Virginia
Daily Mail (Brisbane), defunct Australian newspaper
Daily Mail (Hagerstown), American newspaper formerly published in Hagerstown, Maryland
Hull Daily Mail, British newspaper published in East Yorkshire
Irish Daily Mail, an edition of the UK Daily Mail published in the Republic of Ireland and in Northern Ireland
Olney Daily Mail, American newspaper
The Rand Daily Mail, South African newspaper formerly published in Johannesburg
Zambia Daily Mail, Zambian newspaper published in Lusaka

Other usages
"The Daily Mail", a song by alternative rock band Radiohead

See also
 Daily (disambiguation)
 Mail (disambiguation)